Buffalo Point First Nation is an Ojibwa or Saulteaux First Nations located in the southeastern corner of Manitoba, along the shores of Lake of the Woods. It is bordered largely by the unorganized portion of Division No. 1, Manitoba, and also has smaller borders with the Rural Municipality of Piney, as well as the northeast corner of Roseau County, Minnesota.

The main reserve of Buffalo Point 36 contains the resort community of Buffalo Point, Manitoba.

The First Nation is independent, but was once a member of the Southeast Resource Development Council. Though a signatory to Treaty 3, the First Nation is not a member of the Grand Council of Treaty 3.

Reserves

The First Nation has six reserve lands:
 Reed River 36A — with a total size of 
 Buffalo Point First Nation Indian Reserve 1 — total size of 
Buffalo Point First Nation Indian Reserve 2 — total size of 
Buffalo Point First Nation Indian Reserve 3 — total size of 

Governance
Buffalo Point First Nation is governed by a traditional system of government where the leadership is determined by a traditional, hereditary system. The number of councillors is determined by the federal Crown–Indigenous Relations and Northern Affairs department. The current leadership is Chief John Thunder and two Councillors.

The First Nation is independent, but was once a member of the Southeast Resource Development Council. Though a signatory to Treaty 3, the First Nation is not a member of the Grand Council of Treaty 3.

Notable citizens 
 Eddy Cobiness (1933–1996), visual artist

References

External links
AANDC profile
 Map of Buffalo Point 36 at Statcan
  Buffalo Point First Nation

First Nations governments in Manitoba
First Nations in Eastman Region, Manitoba
Saulteaux